Thuramukham is a 2023 Indian Malayalam-language political drama film directed and filmed by Rajeev Ravi. The screenplay, written by Gopan Chidambaran, is based on the play of the same name by his father K. M. Chidambaran. The film stars Nivin Pauly, Indrajith Sukumaran, Joju George, Arjun Ashokan, Sudev Nair, Manikandan R. Achari, Senthil Krishna, Nimisha Sajayan, Poornima Indrajith and Darshana Rajendran in prominent roles. In the film, the Harbor workers protest against the Chappa labor allocation system practiced during the 1940s and '50s in Cochin district of Kerala state in India.

After multiple delays the film was theatrically released on 10 March 2023.

Premise
The story is set in the backdrop of workers' struggles, and protests against the infamous ‘Chappa’ system of casual labour allocation and primitive "work guarantee" scheme that was practiced at the Mattancherry harbour in Kochi during the 1940s and 50s. Metal tokens called Chappa were thrown into the waiting crowds of labourers, where they would fight for the tickets (Chappa). Whoever manages to get one would be given work for the day at the wharves or godowns. The protests against this system had resulted in the police firing and killing of three labourers. The story further revolves around two brothers being on opposing sides, in the day labourers epic struggle against dock bosses.

Cast
 Nivin Pauly as Mattancherry Moidu
 Indrajith Sukumaran as Santo Gopalan
 Joju George as Mymood 
 Arjun Ashokan as Hamza
 Sudev Nair as Pacheek
 Manikandan R. Achari as Umboocha
 Senthil Krishna as Srank
 Nimisha Sajayan as Umani
 Poornima Indrajith as Moidu's mother
 Darshana Rajendran as Khadeeja

Production
The principal photography of the film was completed in January 2020, but the release was delayed for a long time due to the outbreak of COVID-19 pandemic.

Release

Theatrical 
Thuramukham was scheduled for worldwide theatrical release in Summer 2021, but was postponed due to the rising number of COVID-19 cases in Kerala. The film was later scheduled to be released on 10 December 2021, but it was postponed again, to avoid the clash with Mohanlal starrer Marakkar: Arabikadalinte Simham which released on 2 December 2021. Later, the film was announced to be released on 24 December 2021 during the festival time of Christmas, but it was postponed. The film was postponed yet again after being scheduled to be released on 7 January 2022. The film was finally released in theatres on 10 March 2023.

Marketing
On 13 May 2021, the makers released the first teaser trailer.

Accolades

References

External links
 

Films postponed due to the COVID-19 pandemic
2020s Malayalam-language films
2022 films
2022 drama films
2020s historical drama films
Films scored by K (composer)
Films scored by Shahabaz Aman